Song o' My Heart is a 1930 Pre-Code American film directed by Frank Borzage and starring John McCormack, Alice Joyce, Maureen O'Sullivan, Effie Ellsler and John Garrick. It was O'Sullivan's second film role.

The film was double-shot in both conventional 35mm and the early 70 mm Grandeur film widescreen format. Very few theaters were equipped with the necessary projection equipment to show it in the latter and it was never released in that format.

Synopsis
Sean O'Carolon (McCormack) has retired as an Irish tenor to a village where an old love of his, Mary (Joyce), resides with her children, Eileen (O'Sullivan) and Tad (Tommy Clifford). A once-famous opera singer, Sean has given up his career to live in his old Irish village, near Mary, who had been forced to marry someone else "for money, not love". Mary, now abandoned and with two children, struggles in poverty, and lives in the home of a horrid relation. Sean decides to resume his career as a concert singer, presumably (but not stated) to help Mary and perhaps resume their relationship. On tour in America, however, Sean learns that Mary has died. He decides to cut short his tour and return to Ireland to support Mary's children, and Eileen's marriage to her true love.

Production
Edwin Schneider, McCormack's real piano accompanist, plays the part of Sean's piano accompanist in the film. A lengthy segment of the movie is given over to an actual concert, purportedly in New York City but actually filmed on location in Philharmonic Auditorium in downtown Los Angeles, a massive auditorium of the old "Hippodrome" variety.

The director, Frank Borzage, was the Academy Award winner for direction in 1927 (Seventh Heaven).

References

External links
Song o' My Heart at IMDb

1930 films
1930s romance films
Films produced by Frank Borzage
Films directed by Frank Borzage
American black-and-white films
Fox Film films
American romance films
1930s American films